The 1982 Segunda División Peruana, the second division of Peruvian football (soccer), was played by 6 teams. The tournament winner, Unión Gonzales Prada was promoted to the 1982 Copa Perú.

Results

Standings

References
 2da division 1982

Peruvian Segunda División seasons
Peru2
2